Mohamed Ali Osman (born unknown) is a Somali former footballer.

Career statistics

International

International goals
Scores and results list Somalia's goal tally first.

References

Date of birth unknown
Living people
Association football midfielders
Somalian footballers
Somalia international footballers
Somalian expatriate footballers
Expatriate footballers in Kuwait
Year of birth missing (living people)